Zhao Yongfu is a rear admiral (shao jiang) of the People's Liberation Army Navy (PLAN) of China. He served as president of the PLA Naval Academy of Armament from 2008 to 2011, and as president of the PLA Naval University of Engineering from May 2011 to December 2014.

Biography
He assumed various posts in the People's Liberation Army Navy (PLAN), including president of the PLA Naval Academy of Armament, executive director of the Chinese Society of Naval Architecture and Marine Engineering (CSNAME), and vice-chairman of the China Defense Science and Technology Information Institute. He attained the rank of rear admiral (shao jiang) in July 2009. In May 2011, he was appointed president of the PLA Naval University of Engineering, and held that office until December 2014.

References

External links

Living people
People's Liberation Army Navy admirals
Year of birth missing (living people)